Ematurga amitaria, the cranberry spanworm moth, is a moth in the family Geometridae described by Achille Guenée in 1858. It is found in North America.

The MONA or Hodges number for Ematurga amitaria is 6436.

References

Further reading
Arnett, Ross H. (2000). American Insects: A Handbook of the Insects of America North of Mexico. CRC Press.
Lafontaine, J. Donald, & Schmidt, B. Christian (2010). "Annotated check list of the Noctuoidea (Insecta, Lepidoptera) of North America north of Mexico". ZooKeys. vol. 40, 1-239.

External links
Butterflies and Moths of North America

Geometridae